Ralph van Dooren (born 6 June 1981) is a Dutch former professional footballer who played as a centre-back or midfielder.

Club career
Van Dooren played for Eerste Divisie clubs MVV and FC Eindhoven before moving abroad to join Faroe Islands Premier League Football side B68 Toftir in March 2006. He duly became the first Dutch footballer to play in the football league of Faroe Islands. Van Dooren followed his then girlfriend to Denmark where he signed for second division club FC Hjørring for the rest of the season 2006–2007. However, he returned to B68 Toftir at the beginning of 2008.

He returned to Holland to play for amateur side EVV in November 2008, only to quit football months later after falling six meters from a balcony, injuring his back. He now works as a truck driver.

International career
Van Dooren played for the Netherlands U19 national team.

References

1981 births
Living people
Dutch footballers
Footballers from Maastricht
Association football midfielders
MVV Maastricht players
FC Eindhoven players
B68 Toftir players
Vendsyssel FF players
Eredivisie players
Eerste Divisie players
Dutch expatriate footballers
Dutch expatriate sportspeople in the Faroe Islands
Expatriate footballers in the Faroe Islands
Dutch expatriate sportspeople in Denmark
Expatriate men's footballers in Denmark
21st-century Dutch people